The 1964 United States Senate election in West Virginia was held on November 3, 1964 alongside the 1964 United States presidential election. Incumbent Senator Robert Byrd won re-election in a landslide.

Background 

Incumbent Senator Robert Byrd ran for a second term in this election. President Lyndon B. Johnson also ran for re-election. Johnson won West Virginia by a very large margin. Johnson was also re-elected President of the United States  in 1964 . Democrats also gained two seats in the Senate in the 1964 United States Senate elections.

Results

References 

1964
West Virginia
United States Senate
Robert Byrd